Bovey may refer to:

Bovey, Minnesota, United States
Bovey (surname)
River Bovey, Devon, England
Bovey Tracey, a town in Devon, England
North Bovey, a village in Devon, England